Oneida Golf and Country Club, often simply just called Oneida, is a country club located in Green Bay, Wisconsin. Established in 1928, this club has both a pool and tennis area as well as a golf course.

Golf Course
Oneida Golf and Country Club was established in 1928. The 18-hole, par 72 golf course layout was designed by golf architect Stanley Pelcher, redesigned by Roger Packard and undergoing renovations in the fall of 2015 under the direction of Steve Forrest of Hills and Forrest International Golf Course Architecture. Onieda consists of over 6,600 yards that spreads across 200 acres. Oneida was named a “TOP 15” in Wisconsin for 2015 by Golf Digest.

Many of golf's greats have played Oneida; among them, Sam Snead, Walter Hagen, Ben Hogan, Jack Nicklaus, and former Masters Champion Horton Smith who referred to the course as “an endurance test”.

Scorecard

External links
 Official Site

Buildings and structures in Green Bay, Wisconsin
Golf clubs and courses in Wisconsin